Trafficking protein particle complex 6A is a protein that in humans is encoded by the TRAPPC6A gene.

Function

This gene encodes a component of the trafficking protein particle complex, which tethers transport vesicles to the cis-Golgi membrane. Loss of expression of the related gene in mouse affects coat and eye pigmentation, suggesting that the encoded protein may be involved in melanosome biogenesis. Alternatively spliced transcript variants encoding multiple isoforms have been observed for this gene. [provided by RefSeq, Aug 2012].

References

Further reading